Valley High School is a high school in Louisville, Kentucky.

.

.

See also
 Public schools in Louisville, Kentucky

References

External links
 Valley High School MCA
 History of Valley High School
 Valley High School Alumni Association Social Page
 Valley High School Alumni Association Information Page

Jefferson County Public Schools (Kentucky)
Public high schools in Kentucky
High schools in Louisville, Kentucky